Lectionary 1637, or ℓ 1637 in the Gregory-Aland numbering, 
is a Greek manuscript of the New Testament on parchment leaves, dated paleographically to the 9th century.

Description
It is written in Greek Uncial letters on 144 leaves (30 by 26 cm), 2 columns per page. The codex contains some Lessons from the four Gospels lectionary (Evangelistarium). The manuscript contains several library inserts. It is a palimpsest. The upper text is written in a minuscule hand. 

It was described by Kenneth Willis Clark. 

The codex now is located in the University of Michigan (MS. 37) in Ann Arbor.

See also 
 List of New Testament lectionaries 
 Textual criticism

References

Further reading 
 K. W. Clark, A Descriptive Catalogue of Greek New Testament Manuscripts in America (Chicago: 1937), pp. 314-315.

External links 
 Lectionary 1637 at the CSNTM 

Greek New Testament lectionaries 
Palimpsests
9th-century biblical manuscripts